John Usiwoma Aruakpor (born 10 February 1960) is the Nigerian bishop of Anglican Diocese of Oleh in the Church of Nigeria.

Aruakpor was elected bishop for the Diocese of Oleh in March 2012. He was consecrated and enthroned in July 2012.

Notes

References

1960 births
Living people
Anglican bishops of Oleh